Nanda chaur is a village in Hoshiarpur district, Punjab, India. Nanda chaur village is also known as Nanda Chaur Dham because of Shri Om Darbar temple situated at Nanda chaur.
There are many school and colleges in Nanda Chaur village and a Hospital is also here.
The village is situated at  Bullowal to Bhogpur road and approximately 20 km from its belonging district Hoshiarpur.
Nanda Chaur village's mostly people are well educated, well behaved and helping people. All people from different religions are living peacefully here.

Demographics
According to Census 2011 Nanda Chaur village has population of 3478 of which 1780 are males while 1698 are females as per Population Census 2011. And total number of families residing here are 723.

Education

Colleges
 There is one degree college Shri Om Narayan Dutt Girls degree college Nanda Chaur.

Schools
 Govt High School.
 Govt Primary School.
 Sant Shardha Ram ji Girls school.
 Hrakrishan Public school.

Distance from other cities
Hoshiarpur = 18 km, Chandigarh = 157 km, Jalandhar = 38 km, New Delhi = 420 km,   Dharmshala = 135 km.

References

Villages in Hoshiarpur district